My Brother, My Sister is a 2021 Italian film directed and written by Roberto Capucci and starring Caterina Murino, Alessandro Preziosi and Frank Gerrish. Netflix released the film for streaming on 8 October 2021.

Synopsis 
Siblings Nik (Alessandro Preziosi) and Tesla (Claudia Pandolfi) are forced to live together in their father’s house according to his will after his demise. There they will try to overcome their differences and become a family.

Cast 
 Alessandro Preziosi as Nikola "Nik"
 Claudia Pandolfi as Tesla
  as Carolina
 Francesco Cavallo as Sebastiano
  as Emma
 Caterina Murino as Giada
 Frank Gerrish as Federico

References

External links
 
 

2021 films
Italian drama films
2020s Italian-language films
Italian-language Netflix original films
Films shot in Lazio
2021 drama films